David C. Schwartz (February 27, 1939 – June 10, 2022) was an American politician who served in the New Jersey General Assembly from the 17th Legislative District from 1978 to 1992.

He died on June 10, 2022, at the age of 83.

References

1939 births
2022 deaths
Democratic Party members of the New Jersey General Assembly
Politicians from New York City